906 Repsolda is a minor planet orbiting the Sun. It is named for the German astronomer and fireman Johann Georg Repsold (1770–1830), who founded and ran Hamburg Observatory.

References

External links 
 
 

000906
Discoveries by Friedrich Karl Arnold Schwassmann
Named minor planets
19181030